Natural Enemy is a 1996 Canadian-American thriller film directed by Douglas Jackson and starring Donald Sutherland, William McNamara, Lesley Ann Warren, Joe Pantoliano, and Tia Carrere.

Filming
The film was shot in Montreal, Quebec from 18 November 1995 to 15 December 1995.

Plot
Ted Robards, in the past a successful stock broker, is on the verge of financial ruin. His son, Chris, has disappointed Ted a long time ago, creating only troubles for him. His wife, Sandy, is obsessed with the idea of having the second child. Ted's last hope is a promising young employee, Jeremy Harper, a stellar Harvard alumnus, who is able to sign an important deal that will save Ted and his firm from imminent bankruptcy. However, Jeremy only pretends to support the firm. His real desire is to secretly destroy Ted's business from within, while also wreaking havoc on the whole Robards family.

Trying to keep Jeremy in the firm, Ted tries to fulfill at least one of his requests—he offers Jeremy and his girlfriend to move in with him and thus solve their housing issue. Jeremy agrees, but his appearance in the house only accelerates the Robards' demise. In vain, Ted and Sandy try to understand what caused Jeremy's unexpected aggression. But flashbacks reveal Jeremy's traumatic childhood and his hidden motivation. Later, it turns out that Ted's now pregnant wife has some dark secrets that may explain Jeremy's twisted plans to destroy her family.

Cast
 Donald Sutherland as Ted Robards
 William McNamara as Jeremy Harper
Michael Caloz as Young Jeremy Harper
 Lesley Ann Warren as Sandy Robards
 Joe Pantoliano as Stuart
 Tia Carrere as Christina
 Christian Tessier as Chris Robards
 Lenore Zann as Gina
 Rosemary Dunsmore as Judy
 Vlasta Vrana as Stanley
 Claudia Besso as Claire
 Serge Houde as Sherwood
 Richard Zeman as Bob
 Terry Haig as IRS Agent
 Tedd Dillon as Father
 Misha Jackson as Baby

References

External links

1996 films
English-language Canadian films
Canadian thriller films
American thriller films
C/FP Distribution films
Films directed by Douglas Jackson
1990s English-language films
1990s American films
1990s Canadian films